Edward Gilbert was an American newspaper editor and California politician.

Edward Gilbert may also refer to:

 Eddie Gilbert (cricketer) (1905–1978), Australian Aboriginal cricketer
 Eddie Gilbert (wrestler) (1961–1995), American wrestler
 Ed Gilbert (ice hockey) (born 1952), retired Canadian ice hockey forward
 Edward Joseph Gilbert (born 1936), Roman Catholic Archbishop of Port of Spain, Trinidad and Tobago
 Edward A. Gilbert (1854–1935), Nebraska politician

Ed Gilbert may also refer to:
 Ed Gilbert (1931–1999), American actor
 Edmund William Gilbert (1900–1973), British social geographer
 Edgar Gilbert (1923–2013), American mathematician and coding theorist